Mohammadjan-e Falak ol Din (also Romanized as Moḩammadjān-e Falak ol Dīn and Moḩammadjān-e Falak od Dīn; also known as Moḩammadjān) is a village in Khaveh-ye Jonubi Rural District, in the Central District of Delfan County, Lorestan Province, Iran. At the 2006 census, its population was 194, in 50 families.

References 

Towns and villages in Delfan County